Parviparma straminea is a species of fish in the family Butidae endemic to the Philippines.  This species is the only known member of its genus.

References

External links

Butidae
Monotypic fish genera